Baltayevo (Baltay) is a rural locality (a selo) in Karamaly-Gubeyevsky Selsoviet, Tuymazinsky District, Bashkortostan, Russia. The population was 377 as of 2010. There are 5 streets.

Geography 
Baltayevo is located 40 km southeast of Tuymazy (the district's administrative centre) by road. Aytaktamak is the nearest rural locality.

References 

Rural localities in Tuymazinsky District